Urmas Saaliste (born September 22, 1960 in Tartu) is an Estonian sport shooter. He competed at the Summer Olympics in 1988 and 1992. In 1988, he placed seventh in the mixed trap event, and in 1992, he tied for 39th place in the mixed trap event.

References

1960 births
Living people
Trap and double trap shooters
Estonian male sport shooters
Soviet male sport shooters
Shooters at the 1988 Summer Olympics
Shooters at the 1992 Summer Olympics
Olympic shooters of the Soviet Union
Olympic shooters of Estonia
Sportspeople from Tartu